Charles Frederick Cheffins (10 September 1807 – 23 October 1861) was a British mechanical draughtsman, cartographer, consulting engineer, and surveyor. He was an assistant to John Ericsson and George Stephenson, and surveyed for many British railroad companies in the mid-19th century. He is also known for the 1850 Cheffins' Map of English & Scotch Railways and other maps.

Biography 

Cheffins was born in London, where his father was the manager of the New River Waterworks Company and supervised the manufacturing of wooden pipes used to supply water to the metropolis. Young Cheffins was admitted into Christ's Hospital as a scholar in July 1815. He remained there until 1822, diligently pursuing his studies, and received several gold medals for his proficiency in mathematics.

Upon completion of his education, he was apprenticed to Messrs. Newton and Son, patent agents and mechanical draughtsmen, where he became practised in making drawings from specifications and from models of machinery. He remained as an employee with Messrs. Newton and Son for some time after completing his apprenticeship.

From 1830 he was engaged by Captain John Ericsson to assist in making drawings for locomotive engines. The next year he became assistant to George Stephenson and prepared plans and sections of the projected Grand Junction Railway. On the completion of the parliamentary submissions for the Grand Junction Railway, between 1832 and 1833, he set up his own cartographical and drawing business, and spent over two decades working as a surveyor for numerous railroad construction projects in the United Kingdom. In 1838, he published his first Map of the Grand Junction Railway and Adjacent Country; and the next year Cheffins's Official Map of the Railway from London to Birmingham, Manchester and Liverpool. In 1846, Cheffins commissioned John Cooke Bourne to write the History of the Great Western Railway. Occasionally, Cheffins also published lithographical work by others. In the year 1848, he had been elected an Associate of the Institution of Civil Engineers and continued to take interest in all their proceedings.

One year before his death in 1861, the partnership between Cheffins and his sons—as surveyors, draftsmen, and lithographers—was dissolved by mutual consent. The business continued with Cheffins and his son Charles Richard Cheffins as partners. Cheffins died suddenly from internal injuries on 23 October 1861, leaving his son Charles to complete the work which he commenced a month or two before his death. His death, at the age of fifty-four, was said to have greatly impacted his friends, colleagues, and assistants, who had served under him in the numerous parliamentary campaigns in which he had been engaged – and to many of whom he had shown much kindness in recommending them to posts of trust and responsibility on the Indian Railways.

Work

Locomotive design 

About the year 1830, he was engaged by Captain John Ericsson to assist in making the drawings for the Novelty locomotive engine, then about to be constructed by Messrs. Braithwaite and Ericsson, to compete against the Stephenson's Rocket and other locomotives on the Rainhill Trials on the Manchester and Liverpool Railway. The competition went against the Novelty, on account of the failure of its blast apparatus.

Cheffins was present at the opening of the Liverpool and Manchester Railway, and remained some time longer with Captain Ericsson, making drawings for other inventions, among which was a steam fire-engine and a caloric engine – machines which gained public attention, the former of which coming into general use. Cheffins's practical knowledge of machinery rendered him a valuable assistant in the preparation of the designs.

Testimony in patent-right lawsuits 
In 1830, Cheffins reputation was such that he testified for the "defendants" in the patent infringement case of Lord Galloway and Alexander Cochrane versus John Braithwaite and John Ericsson, in the Court of Chancery, where it was alleged that the boilers of the Novelty locomotive were of a type too similar to a design of the plaintiffs and where the Lord Chancellor found for the defendants.

Subsequently, Cheffins took the stand in court more often. In one 1847 case narrated in The Railway Record, "Charles F. Cheffins, engineer and surveyor, was called for the defence, proved that he had examined the plans and sections in question, and detected so many errors that the case became quite clear."

Grand Junction Railway 
In 1831, Cheffins was introduced to railway pioneer George Stephenson by Stephenson's oldest associate and surveyor, a Mr. Padley. After the successful opening of the Liverpool and Manchester Railway, Stephenson became prominently involved in numerous other schemes.

Cheffins' first occupation under Stephenson was the preparation of the plans and sections of the projected Grand Junction Railway, which was to connect the towns of Birmingham and Liverpool; and his persevering industry was noticed by, among other eminent engineers, Joseph Locke, Frederick Swanwick, Daniel Gooch.

Lithograph of London Station 

In 1830, Cheffins started making lithographs, which were published in magazines such as an engraving representing the London Terminus of the London and Birmingham Railway, at Button Grove, in an 1837 issue of John Limbird's The Mirror of Literature, Amusement, and Instruction. The engraving was reduced from a drawing by Thomas Allom and lithographed by Cheffins.

The structure was being erected at the time of the publication. The building was designed by Philip Hardwick, an architect of St. Katherine's Docks, Goldsmith's Hall, the City Clubhouse, and other buildings. The facade of the railway station would occupy about 300 feet towards Drummond Street, opposite a wide opening into Euston Square. The principal elevation consisted of a Grecian Doric portico, with two antae, and two lodges, one on each side, the latter to house the offices of the company; the spaces between the columns and antae of the portico, and also of the lodges, were enclosed by iron gates.

Other lithographic work 

In his studio at 9, Southampton Buildings, Holborn, Cheffins lithographed work for numerous other artists:
 1837 – In the month of August, Cheffins published a lithographed plate of a view of the apparatus used in the steamboat Francis B. Ogden, with a description of its construction and use.
 1837 – Illustrations for the book Scenery in the north of Devon. George Rowe; Charles F. Cheffins; Paul Gauci; George Hawkins; Henry Strong; G. Wilkins. Published by J. Banfield, Ilfracombe.
 1844 – Illustrations for Quarterly papers on architecture. : Forty-one engravings, many of which are coloured. by Richard Hamilton Essex; John Richard Jobbins; John Henry Le Keux; Charles F. Cheffins; R Gould; Published by London: Iohan Weale.
 1848 – Illustration "Perspective view of machinery in Fulton's Clermont" for Henry Bernoulli Barlow
 1848 – Illustrations for A sketch of the origin and progress of steam navigation from authentic documents by Bennet Woodcroft.
 1852 – Lithographed illustrations of The Garden Companion and Florists' Guide by Thomas Moore.
 1852 – Lithographed London map designed by Benjamin Rees Davies.
 1854 – Drawing and publication of the famous map by John Snow that shows the clusters of cholera cases in the London epidemic of 1854.

Railroad surveys 
On the completion of the parliamentary submissions for the Grand Junction Railway, Cheffins terminated his engagement with Stephenson. Foreseeing that railway schemes were only then in their infancy and that much work might be anticipated, Cheffins devoted himself exclusively to the surveying department of the profession and established himself in London, working independently, while retaining the patronage of those with whom he had been previously associated and adding other names to his list of friends. Robert Stephenson, the son of George, was among the latter, and under his direction and superintendence, Cheffins prepared many of the designs for the construction of the bridges on the London and Birmingham Railway. Cheffins was also engaged by Stephenson on other matters. Their friendship lasted until Stephenson's death, and Cheffins continued to hold him in high regard as someone crucial to his own success.

In his further professional career, Cheffins completed numerous projects for the London and Blackwall Railway, the Great Eastern Railway (then the Eastern Counties Railway), the Trent Valley Line, and the North Staffordshire Railway—a few of which he lived to see to completion, although they were opposed in both houses of Parliament by other companies and large landed proprietors.

In 1846, in recognition for Cheffins's services, a service of plate was presented to him by, among others, the leading engineers of the day.

The last initiative Cheffins was a part of was the projected Great Eastern Northern Junction Railway Bill of 1860, (known familiarly as the "Coal Line"), which his friend George Parker Bidder had put in his hands, and in which he took an interest; but he died before its completion.

Selected publications 
Cheffins published dozens of maps, most of railways. A selection:
 Charles F. Cheffins. London & Birmingham railway: a plan of the line and adjacent country. London: C. F. Cheffins, 1835.
 Charles F. Cheffins. London and Birmingham railway: Map of the Railway from London to Box-Moor, and the adjacent Country. London: Charles F. Cheffins, 1 August 1837; 1838 edition with Thomas W. Streeter.
 Charles F. Cheffins; Thomas W. Streeter. Map of the Grand Junction Railway and adjacent country. 1838
 Charles Frederick Cheffins. Cheffins's Official Map of the Railway from London to Birmingham, Manchester and Liverpool. Wrightson & Webb. 1839
 Charles F. Cheffins; North Woolwich Railway. Plan and section of the North Woolwich Railway, in the counties of Essex and Kent. 1844
 Charles Frederick Cheffins. Cheffins's map of the railways in Great Britain: from the ordnance surveys. 1845
 Charles F. Cheffins. Map of the North Staffordshire lines: deposited with the Clerks of the Peace, Novr. 1845
 Charles F. Cheffins. Plans and Sections of the Norwich and Dereham Railway 1845
 Charles F. Cheffins. Furness Railway. London: C.F. Cheffins, lithographer, 1846.
 Charles Frederick Cheffins. Cheffins's Map of English & Scotch Railways: accurately delineating all the lines at present opened ; and those which are in progress. Corrected to the present time, the map also shows the main roads throughout the kingdom, with the distances between the towns, forming a complete guide for the traveller and tourist. 1847, 1850
 Charles F. Cheffins. Proposed railway from Cairo to the Sea of Suez. London: C.F. Cheffins, 184ff.
 Charles F. Cheffins. Cheffins's station map of the railways in Great Britain, from authentic sources. London: Charles F. Cheffins and Sons, 1859

Other maps, a selection:
 Charles Frederick Cheffins. Chart of the Gulf of Mexico, off St. Joseph's Island. R. Hastings, 1841
 Charles Frederick Cheffins. A map of the Republic of Texas and the adjacent territories, indicating the grants of land conceded under the Empresario System of Mexico. London: R. Hastings, 1841.
 Charles Frederick Cheffins; Monroe. Aranzas Bay, as surveyed by Captn. Monroe of the 'Amos Wright{'}. London: R. Hastings, 1841
 Benjamin Rees Davies; Charles F. Cheffins; Orr & Compy.; Letts, Son & Co.,; J. Cross & Son. London and its environs. London: Charles F. Cheffins. 1854
 Charles Frederick Cheffins. Plan of the Manor of Newington Barrow, Otherwise Highbury, in Islington. C.F. Cheffins, Lithr. 1856

Notes

References 

Attribution

External links

 Charles Frederick Cheffins on gracesguide.co.uk
 Charles Frederick Cheffins on National Railway Museum; Data of 115 works by C.F. Cheffins

1807 births
1861 deaths
19th-century cartographers
Engineers from London
British lithographers
British railway civil engineers